() is a 1958 Norwegian film directed by Arild Brinchmann. It was entered into the 8th Berlin International Film Festival.

Cast
 Urda Arneberg as Kari Holm
 Pål Skjønberg as Per Holm, an architect
 Ola Isene as Enger, the chief physician
 Marit Halset as Doctor Krag
 Mona Hofland as Liv Holst, Per Holm's colleague
 Turid Steen as the patient
 Alfred Maurstad as the director
 Erling Lindahl as the physician
 Evy Engelsborg as the nurse
 Betzy Holter

References

External links

1958 films
1950s Norwegian-language films
Norwegian black-and-white films
Films directed by Arild Brinchmann